Several cities include one or more outer ring roads, including:

Australia
Outer Metropolitan Ring Road, Melbourne

China
S20 Outer Ring Expressway in Shanghai
Outer Ring Road (Tianjin)

India
Outer Ring Road, Amaravati
Outer Ring Road, Bangalore
Outer Ring Road, Chennai
Outer Ring Road, Chhindwara
Outer Ring Road, Delhi
Outer Ring Road, Erode
Outer Ring Road, Hyderabad
Outer Ring Road, Nagpur
Outer Ring Road, Trivandrum
Outer Ring Road, Warangal

Indonesia
Jakarta Outer Ring Road
Jakarta Outer Ring Road 2

Ireland
 The R136 road in Dublin

Kenya 

 Outer Ring Road, Nairobi

Malaysia
KLIA Outer Ring Road in Sepang
Kuala Lumpur Outer Ring Road in Kuala Lumpur
Penang Outer Ring Road in George Town
Butterworth Outer Ring Road

Singapore
The Outer Ring Road System

South Africa
Durban Outer Ring Road

Thailand
 Bangkok Outer Ring Road, see Thai motorway network

United Kingdom
The A4040 road in Birmingham
Leeds Outer Ring Road
Sheffield Outer Ring Road